Eric Magrane is a geographer, poet, writer, and assistant professor of geography at New Mexico State University. He has published several poems, peer-reviewed journals, and books. His work is notable in the human geography subfield of geopoetics, both as a contributor and in helping to define the field.

Education and field

Magrane moved from New England to Arizona to pursue his Masters of Fine Arts in Literature at Arizona State University, which he earned in 2001. Magrane earned his Ph.D. in geography from the University of Arizona in 2017. His dissertation is titled "Creative Geographies and Environments: Geopoetics in the Anthropocene." Magrane's work is extremely broad, ranging from literary to scientific. He focuses on narrative responses and perceptions of the Anthropocene, specifically anthropogenic climate change. He is one of the leading academics in the field of geopoetics.

Ph.D. in Geography, The University of Arizona, 2017
Master of Fine Arts in Creative Writing, The University of Arizona, 2001
Bachelor of Arts, Goddard College, 1998

Career and publications

Magrane worked as a hiking guide in Arizona at Canyon Ranch Health Resorts for nine years between 2003 and 2012 after receiving his Master's Degree. During this time, he published several literary works, performed numerous public poetry readings, and taught courses on poetry and writing at both the University of Arizona Poetry Center and Pima Community College. Magrane has continued to perform public poetry readings throughout his career. While working as a guide, Magrane became interested in geography, ultimately leading to him seeking a geography Ph.D. in 2012 from the University of Arizona. While working on his Ph.D., he served as a Teaching and Research associate, teaching several classes.

In 2017 after Magrane received his Ph.D., he became a visiting assistant professor at the New Mexico State University department of geography. In 2018 he took a position as a tenure track associate professor in the same department. Among the various geography courses he has taught, "Field Explorations" stands out as unique in that students were physically taken to sites in the American Southwest, including the Grand Canyon and Glen Canyon Dam.

Magrane's background in creative writing and geography is reflected in his research and publications. The book 'The Sonoran Desert: A Literary Field Guide' which he co-edited, demonstrates this approach by combining a scientific field guide with artistic illustrations and literature about the species represented. Broadly, his writing focuses on narratives related to the Anthropocene, responses to environmental change, and human perspectives on place.  Examples of topics he has had published in peer-reviewed journals include bycatch in the Gulf of California shrimp trawling fishery and anthropogenic climate change.

His unique background has helped him become a significant figure in the geography subdiscipline of geopoetics. His paper 'Situating geopoetics' appeared in the first issue of the American Association of Geographers journal GeoHumanities and serves as a landmark publication documenting the history of geopolitics, its current status, and possible avenues of future exploration. His paper 'Climate geopoetics (the earth is a composted poem),' published in Dialogues in Human Geography (currently the geography journal with the highest impact factor), received several responses, and helped bring attention to geopoetics among mainstream geographers.   He co-authored "Geopoetics in Practice," a textbook designed to demonstrate the intersection of geography and poetry in a way that academics and lay people can understand.

He serves on the editorial board of the journals Annals of the American Association of Geographers and Terrain.

Awards and recognition
2016 Southwest Book Award
2016 New Mexico–Arizona Book Award
2016 Southwest Books of the Year Top Pick

See also
American Association of Geographers
New Mexico State University
Kenneth White

References

External links
NMSU Geography official website

American geographers
Cultural geographers
Human geographers
21st-century American poets
Living people
New Mexico State University faculty
Year of birth missing (living people)